Atwater Village is a neighborhood in the 13th district of Los Angeles, California. Much of Atwater Village lies in the fertile Los Angeles River flood plain. Located in the northeast region of the city, Atwater borders Griffith Park and Silver Lake to the west, Glendale to the north and east, and Glassell Park to the south. The eastern boundary is essentially the railroad tracks (originally, the Southern Pacific). The area has three elementary schools—two public and one private. Almost half the residents were born abroad, a high percentage for the city of Los Angeles.

History

Much of Northeastern Los Angeles was part of Rancho San Rafael, until 1868, when parts of it were purchased by W.C.B. Richardson, who renamed it Rancho Santa Eulalia. The entire region was subdivided and sold to home builders in 1902, with the Atwater Village portion being named as such due to its proximity to the Los Angeles River. The area was initially named "Atwater," while the "Village" was added in 1986.

Initial residents included the newly created middle-class workers employed at the nearby DWP substation. The location between the Los Angeles and Glendale city cores made it a highly sought after residential neighborhood beginning in the 1920s. The majority of  homes and structures in Atwater Village have never been demolished (although many have changed in use or have been renovated), resulting in the neighborhood having one of the highest number of structures built before 1939 in Los Angeles County.

In recent years, the neighborhood has seen an increase in gentrification.

Population

2013 findings

Census tracts 1883, 1881 and 1871.01 lie wholly within Atwater Village boundaries, and a large portion of census tract 1871.02 is also within Atwater Village. Here are the five-year findings as reported by American Community Survey in 2013:

Census tract 1883 had a median income of $31,111 and was 37.8% non-Hispanic white, 34.1% Hispanic, 20.2% Asian, 1.6% Pacific Islander and 1.1% black. Census tract 1871.01 had a median income of $72,526 and was 42.9% non-Hispanic white, 34.4% Hispanic, 21.2% Asian and 1.4% black. Census tract 1881 was 60.3% Hispanic, 23.9% non-Hispanic white, 13.2% Asian, 2% black and 1.3% American Indian or Alaska Native. Median income for this census tract was $30,996. Census tract 1871.02 was 47.9% Hispanic, 27.5% non-Hispanic white, 13.9% Asian and 8.4% black, with a median income of $24,852.

2008 estimate

In 2008, the city estimated that 15,455 people lived in Atwater Village.

2000 census

The 2000 U.S. census counted 14,888 residents in the 1.78-square-mile Atwater Village neighborhood—or 8,379 people per square mile, an average population density for the city. The median age for residents was 34, about average for the city.

The neighborhood was considered highly diverse ethnically, with a high percentage of Asians. The breakdown was Latinos, 51.3%; whites, 22.2%; Asians, 19.7%; black, 1.4%; and others, 5.4%. Mexico (27.2%) and the Philippines (20.4%) were the most common places of birth for the 49.3% of the residents who were born abroad—a high percentage, compared to the city at large.

The median yearly household income in 2008 dollars was $53,872, an average figure for Los Angeles. The percentages of households that earned $20,000 to $60,000 yearly were high for Los Angeles County. The average household size of 2.7 people was average for Los Angeles. Renters occupied 59.6% of the housing stock, and house or apartment owners held 40.4%. The percentage of never-married women was among the county's highest.

Geography
Much of Atwater lies in the old Los Angeles River flood plain, which resulted in deep, fertile soil.

According to the Mapping L.A. project of the Los Angeles Times, Atwater Village is bordered on the north and east by Glendale, on the southeast by Glassell Park, on the south  by Echo Park,  on the southwest by Los Feliz and Silver Lake and on the west by Griffith Park.

Street and other boundary limits are the Ventura Freeway on the north, San Fernando Boulevard on the east, and the Los Angeles River on the south and west.

Education

22% of Atwater Park residents aged 25 and older held a four-year degree by 2000, an average figure for both the city and the county.

Schools 
 Glenfeliz Boulevard Elementary School, LAUSD, 3955 Glenfeliz Boulevard
 Holy Trinity Elementary School, private, 3716 Boyce Avenue
 Atwater Avenue Elementary School, LAUSD, 3271 Silver Lake Boulevard

Library

The Atwater Village District is served by the Atwater Village Branch of the Los Angeles Public Library. It is located at 3379 Glendale Boulevard, east of the Los Angeles River and Interstate 5.

Transportation
Atwater Village is close to the Interstate 5, SR 134, SR 2 and SR 110 freeways.

It is served by several Metro Bus lines, including the 92, 94 & 180. It also is adjacent to Metrolink Glendale Station.

In popular culture
A number of film locations in Atwater Village were used for Quentin Tarantino's movie Pulp Fiction, including the house of Lance (Eric Stoltz) and his wife, Jody (Rosanna Arquette).

Atwater Village was featured in Our Neighborhoods with Huell Howser.

Atwater Village has been used recently  as a setting in HBO'S Winning Time (the basketball court in North Atwater Park was used as the court in Michigan where Magic Johnson battled a romantic rival during a trip back home after college and before his rookie season), in the first episode of the final season of Westworld (exteriors where Aaron Paul attempts to rescue his daughter) and in the first season of This Fool on Hulu (exterior flashback scene). Exteriors in Atwater Village are often used as a stand in for locations in south and east Los Angeles.

See also
 List of districts and neighborhoods in Los Angeles

References

External links

  Comments about living in Atwater Village
  Atwater Village crime map and statistics
 Atwater Village book
 Atwater Village Chamber of Commerce
 Friends of Atwater Village
 Atwater Village Neighborhood Council
 Councilman Eric Garcetti's website, 13th district

 
1912 establishments in California
Hipster neighborhoods
Neighborhoods in Los Angeles
Northeast Los Angeles
Populated places established in 1912